Deliverance Creek is a 2014 American Civil War drama film directed by Jon Amiel and written by Melissa Carter. It premiered on the Lifetime Network on September 13, 2014. It was produced by Nicholas Sparks. 

The film has been described as having a hodge-podge of cobbled-together storylines and as a backdoor pilot. For the film, Carter won the Writers Guild of America Award in 2015 for Outstanding Script, in the "Original Long form" category.

Plot

Set two years after the commence of the American Civil War, it is loosely centered around events connected to Belle Gaitlin Barlow. Deliverance Creek, MO is where the union troops pay will be delivered, so a group of union desserters go there to intercept it. 

Belle lives in Deliverance Creek with her three children, trying to maintain the farm as her husband Harlan left to fight in the war. She presumes he's dead as she's not heard from him since he left two years ago. Belle is involved with Deputy Nate Cooper.

Jeb Crawford, the neighbor and Cordelia's husband hits on Belle, who effectively blocks him. When he gets home, he complains about their run-in and Cordelia notices the slap mark on his face.

In Arkansas Kessie, a slave, sneaks her husband Moses and kids off the plantation so they don't get separated, as he's on a list to be sold at an upcoming auction. When the owner finds them missing he confronts her, vowing to never free her. Acting quickly, Kessie makes an imprint of the safe key, forges her freedom papers and takes cash from the safe to follow her family.

A school teacher, Belle's sister Hattie talks passionately about participating in the Underground Railroad. She goes to collect the first people to hide, Kessie's family, only to find there are more than there is space for.

Cordelia, who works at the bank, is unsympathetic to Belle's financial difficulties and sends a notice which is tacked to her door. When Belle discovers a few of her calves were wrongly branded by Jeb, she convinces him at gunpoint to return them. 

Returning home from town with her kids, Belle detects that someone is on their farm. Approaching the house with a loaded rifle, she soon discovers her brother Jasper and other Union army deserters. Toby, Caleb's actual father, is suffering from a gunshot wound. 

Just as Belle is finishing with removing the bullet, Hattie arrives. Hoping to hide Kessie's children there  overnight, Belle warns her how dangerous that could be with the men there. Hattie convinces the saloon owner to hide them, which he does in empty barrels.

The desserters burn their coats in the back. Belle hears them conspiring to rob the Union soldier payroll, soon to arrive to the local bank. Nate shows up at Belle's farmhouse. After she explains it's Jasper and other desserters, he tries to get her to leave with the kids, but she refuses. The next morning Caleb is asked to get Toby his breakfast and they interact.

In town, Belle realises they will soon search her premises so she races home. She sends off the desserters, hides Toby and tells her kids to hide upstairs. A posse comes by, as remnants of the Union soldiers' things were retrieved from the fire. In their search, Caleb pops out of hiding and is shot dead. After they bury him, Belle tells Toby he was his son.   

Kessie arrives, only to find that Moses and the kids were separated and his fate is unknown. Hattie convinces Belle to take her in under the guise of a slave. 

Belle contacts Jasper to help them steal the Union payroll, as she wants revenge against the Crawfords for Caleb's death. Visiting Nate's office, while he leaves her alone a moment she discovers when security will be increased and therefore when the gold arrives.

Realising that Kessie could help with the heist, Belle asks for her help with it in exchange for her aide in reuniting her family. They devise a plan to copy the safe's keys.

As the Union payroll representatives insist, Cordelia asks Ben to stand watch in the safe overnight. Meanwhile, four of the desserters are snuck into the funeral home next door to the bank, in pine boxes under the guise of a family that perished from smallpox.  

They break into the bank, only to find a new combination lock. Kessie is able to crack the safe, but Ben is shot. Belle is appalled, but Jasper doesn't think twice, as he's a Crawford. Neither know that Ben and Hattie are involved. The men hide the gold, planning to meet in a month to divy out the earnings. Cyril plans to keep it for himself.

The next day, once the robbery is discovered, Ben is in critical condition, Cordelia is told she'll be held responsible for the value of all missing. Nate finds Belle's necklace at the scene of the crime, and the final scene is a wide shot of them meeting, she realising she's missing the necklace.

Cast
 Lauren Ambrose as Belle Gatlin Barlow
 Yaani King as Kessie
 Wes Ramsey as Nate Cooper
 Katherine Willis as Cordelia Crawford
 Caitlin Custer as Hattie Gatlin
 Christopher Backus as Jasper Gatlin
 Barry Tubb as Jeb Crawford
 Riley Smith as Toby
 Christopher Baker as Cyril
 Skeet Ulrich 
 Joel Johnstone as Ben Crawford
 Judah Lewis as Caleb Barlow

References

External links

 
 

2014 television films
2014 Western (genre) films
American Civil War films
Films directed by Jon Amiel
Films scored by James Dooley
Films set in Missouri
Lifetime (TV network) films
Television pilots not picked up as a series
American Western (genre) television films
2014 films
2010s American films
2010s English-language films